The 2006–07 Temple Owls men's basketball team represented Temple University in the 2006–07 NCAA Division I men's basketball season. They were led by first year head coach Fran Dunphy and played their home games at the Liacouras Center. The Owls are members of the Atlantic 10 Conference. They finished the season 12–18 and 6–10 in A-10 play.

Roster

References

2014-15 Temple Owls Men's Basketball Media Guide

Temple
Temple Owls men's basketball seasons
Temple
Temple